Rinus van Kalmthout (born 11 September 2000), known professionally as Rinus VeeKay is a Dutch racing driver. He drives the No. 21 Dallara-Chevrolet for Ed Carpenter Racing in the IndyCar Series.

Career

Karting
van Kalmthout started karting in 2009. The eight-year-old won races in the 4-stroke cadet championship with a DR chassis. He finished second in the championship. During the 2009-2010 winter season van Kalmthout won the 4-stroke cadet series. The following season the young driver graduated into the Briggs & Stratton World Formula 4-stroke class winning the Dutch and Benelux championships. He also focused on the Rotax Max Minimax class winning the Dutch championship in 2012 and Junior championship in 2013. Throughout 2014 and 2015 van Kalmthout raced in various Rotax Max racing series. He finished second in the Rotax Max Euro Challenge Senior class, behind Australian driver Pierce Lehane.

Junior open-wheel formulae
Introduced as Rinus VeeKay, van Kalmthout signed with Pabst Racing to race in the American-based USF2000. VeeKay tested the Tatuus USF-17 at Indianapolis Motor Speedway. The young Dutch driver ran constant top-ten times for the new driver, new team entry. To further prepare for the 2017 season VeeKay raced in the final two rounds of the French V de V Challenge Monoplace. In an MP Motorsport entered 2013 Tatuus Formula Renault 2.0 car VeeKay scored five podium finishes in six races. In the 2017 U.S. F2000 Championship, VeeKay won six races and finished second in the championship to Oliver Askew.

After winning the 2018 Pro Mazda Championship with Juncos Racing, VeeKay stepped up to the Indy Lights championship for 2019 again with Juncos Racing. He finished second in the championship, again behind Askew.

IndyCar Series
In July 2019 it was announced that VeeKay would join the IndyCar test at Portland with Ed Carpenter Racing. On 20 November the team officially signed him as the replacement for Spencer Pigot.

In his first IndyCar race in the Genesys 300 at Texas Motor Speedway he crashed in practice. He missed qualifying as the team couldn't fix the car in time. In the race, he crashed out on lap 38 and collected Alex Palou. At Iowa Speedway, confusion over a postponed restart led Colton Herta to launch over VeeKay's car from the rear; both drivers were unharmed due to a new laminate aeroscreen introduced for 2020. VeeKay achieved his first top 5 finish in IndyCar at the IndyGP and his first podium in the Harvest GP. He was confirmed for a return to ECR in 2021 on October 25, 2020. He won the Indy GP, scoring his first win, 5 seconds ahead of second-placed Romain Grosjean. VeeKay ran as high as fourth place in the championship after back to back top ten finishes including a second-place finish in Detroit before he fractured his clavicle during a cycling accident, forcing him to miss the following race at Road America. After the season VeeKay and ECR announced he had re-signed with the team for another season.

Racing record

Career summary

† As van Kalmthout was a guest driver, he was ineligible for points.
‡ Points only counted towards the Michelin Endurance Cup, and not the overall LMP2 Championship.
* Season still in progress.

American open-wheel racing results

U.S. F2000 National Championship

Pro Mazda Championship

Indy Lights

IndyCar Series
(key)

Indianapolis 500

Complete IMSA SportsCar Championship results
(key) (Races in bold indicate pole position; races in italics indicate fastest lap)

† Points only counted towards the Michelin Endurance Cup, and not the overall LMP2 Championship.
* Season still in progress.

References

External links
 Official website

2000 births
Sportspeople from North Holland
Dutch racing drivers
MRF Challenge Formula 2000 Championship drivers
U.S. F2000 National Championship drivers
Indy Pro 2000 Championship drivers
Indy Lights drivers
IndyCar Series drivers
Indianapolis 500 drivers
People from Haarlemmermeer
Living people
F3 Asian Championship drivers
24 Hours of Daytona drivers
MP Motorsport drivers
Juncos Hollinger Racing drivers
Hitech Grand Prix drivers
Ed Carpenter Racing drivers
DragonSpeed drivers
Racing Team Nederland drivers
WeatherTech SportsCar Championship drivers
TDS Racing drivers